R v Leary, [1978] 1 S.C.R. 29, is the leading Supreme Court of Canada decision on the use of intoxication as an excuse to criminal liability which created what is known as the "Leary rule". The Court held that when the accused was found to be sufficiently intoxicated at the time of the offence to be unable to form the "minimal mental element" required for a general intent offence, they may still be held liable as the act of inducing intoxication can be substituted for the requirement of mens rea.

Aftermath
The "leary rule" was later challenged in the case of R v Daviault, where an exception to the rule was made for when the accused was so intoxicated he was in a state akin to automatism.

See also
 List of Supreme Court of Canada cases
 R v George

External links
 full text at CanLII.org

Supreme Court of Canada cases
Supreme Court of Canada case articles without infoboxes
1978 in Canadian case law
Canadian criminal case law
Alcohol law in Canada